The 50th Annual Tony Awards was broadcast by CBS from the Majestic Theatre on June 2, 1996. Nathan Lane was the host.

The ceremony
The opening number was "The Show Must Go On" performed by Liza Minnelli and Bernadette Peters, with Tony Award Alumni.

Presenters included: Bea Arthur, Edward Albee, Christine Baranski, Harry Belafonte, Matthew Broderick, Diahann Carroll, Hume Cronyn, Nanette Fabray, Robert Goulet, Gregory Hines, Uta Hagen, James Earl Jones, John Lithgow, Liza Minnelli, Patricia Neal, Sarah Jessica Parker, Bernadette Peters, John Rubinstein, Jane Seymour, Ron Silver, Lily Tomlin, Ben Vereen, Eli Wallach, Ray Walston, Lord Andrew Lloyd Webber.

Musicals represented: 
A Funny Thing Happened on the Way to the Forum ("Comedy Tonight" – Nathan Lane and Company); 
The King and I ("Shall We Dance?" – Lou Diamond Phillips, Donna Murphy, and children); 
Bring in 'da Noise, Bring in 'da Funk ("Taxi"/"Bring in 'da Noise, Bring in 'da Funk" – Savion Glover, Ann Duquesnay, Jeffrey Wright and Company); 
Big ("Fun" – Daniel Jenkins, Jon Cypher and Company); 
State Fair ("All I Owe I-Oh-Way" – John Davidson, Andrea McArdle, and Company); 
Rent ("Seasons of Love"/"La Vie Boheme" – Anthony Rapp, Taye Diggs, Adam Pascal, Idina Menzel and Company); 
Chronicle of a Death Foretold; 
Swinging on a Star ("Swinging on a Star" – Company)

Award winners and nominees
Winners are in bold

Special awards
 Special Regional Theatre Award
 Alley Theatre, Houston, Texas

Multiple nominations and awards

These productions had multiple nominations:

10 nominations: Rent 
9 nominations: Bring in 'da Noise, Bring in 'da Funk  
8 nominations: The King and I and Seven Guitars 
7 nominations: A Delicate Balance
5 nominations: Big and Buried Child 
4 nominations: A Funny Thing Happened on the Way to the Forum
3 nominations: An Ideal Husband, Chronicle of a Death Foretold, Inherit the Wind and Master Class 
2 nominations: Company, A Midsummer Night's Dream, Moon Over Buffalo and State Fair  

The following productions received multiple awards.

4 wins: Bring in 'da Noise, Bring in 'da Funk, The King and I and Rent
3 wins: A Delicate Balance and Master Class

See also
 Drama Desk Awards
 1996 Laurence Olivier Awards – equivalent awards for West End theatre productions
 Obie Award
 New York Drama Critics' Circle
 Theatre World Award
 Lucille Lortel Awards

References

New York Times article, "Adding Drama to a Musical, Andrews Spurns the Tonys",  May 9, 1996

External links
Official Site Tony Awards

Tony Awards ceremonies
1996 in theatre
Tony
1996 theatre awards
1996 in New York City